Morettia is a genus of flowering plants belonging to the family Brassicaceae.

Its native range is southern and eastern Mediterranean to the Sahara and the Arabian Peninsula. It is found in the countries of Algeria, Chad, Egypt, the Gulf States, Libya, Mali, Mauritania, Morocco, Niger, Oman, Palestine, Saudi Arabia, Sinai, Sudan, Tunisia and Yemen.

The genus name of Morettia is in honour of Giuseppe Moretti (1782–1853), an Italian botanist. 
It was first described and published in Mém. Mus. Hist. Nat. Vol.7 on page 236 in 1821.

Known species
According to Kew:
Morettia canescens 
Morettia kilianii 
Morettia parviflora 
Morettia philaeana

References

Brassicaceae
Brassicaceae genera
Plants described in 1821
Flora of North Africa
Flora of Niger
Flora of Mali
Flora of Mauritania
Flora of Chad
Flora of Sudan
Flora of Western Asia
Flora of the Arabian Peninsula